Tiverton most often refers to:
Tiverton, Devon, a town in England

Tiverton may also refer to:

Canada
Tiverton, Ontario, a village
Tiverton, Nova Scotia, a village known for its "Balancing Rock"

United Kingdom
Tiverton, Cheshire, a village
Tiverton (UK Parliament constituency), 1621-1997
Tiverton and Honiton (UK Parliament constituency), since 1997, present day successor to the above.

United States
Tiverton, Rhode Island, a New England town
Tiverton (CDP), Rhode Island, a census-designated place comprising the urban portion of the town

See also